Scotts Creek may refer to:

United States
Scotts Creek (California)
Scotts Creek (Delaware River)
Scotts Creek Elementary School
Scotts Creek (Pennsylvania) on List of Delaware River tributaries
Scotts Creek Railway on List of California street railroads
 An alternative name for Scott Creek (Santa Cruz County), California

Australia
Scotts Creek (New South Wales), see Pages River
Scotts Creek, Victoria, a locality in Australia

See also
Scott Creek (disambiguation)